Lakin Township is a township in Barton County, Kansas, United States.  As of the 2010 census, its population was 262.

Lakin Township was organized in 1872.

Geography

Transportation
Lakin Township contains one airport or landing strip, Ellinwood Municipal Airport.

References
 USGS Geographic Names Information System (GNIS)

External links
 US-Counties.com
 City-Data.com

Townships in Barton County, Kansas
Townships in Kansas